Armen Nazaryan (born June 20, 1982 in Hrazdan, Armenian SSR) is an Armenian judoka. Nazaryan was awarded the Master of Sport of Armenia, International Class title in 2005.

Biography
Armen Nazaryan started judo in 1990 in the Sports School of Hrazdan. Nazaryan was first interested in boxing, but moved to judo in 1993. Since 1995, he has been trained by Karen Abagyan. In 2003, he became the Youth European Champion and won a bronze medal at the adult 2003 European Judo Championships. He won a bronze medal again at the 2004 European Judo Championships the following year and competed at the 2004 Summer Olympics in Athens. Nazaryan won a gold medal at the 2005 European Judo Championships in Rotterdam in the weight category of 60 kg. He won all five fights and defeated the current European Champion Ludwig Paischer of Austria in the final. With this success, Nazaryan went down in history as the first European Champion in the history of Armenian judo.

Nazaryan also won a gold medal at the 2005 World Cup in Tallinn. The next year, he won a silver medal at the 2006 European Judo Championships. In 2007, Nazaryan moved up to a heavier weight class of 66 kg and won a bronze medal at the 2007 Summer Universiade in Bangkok. Nazaryan won a gold medal at the 2008 Super World Cup in Moscow and participated at the 2008 Summer Olympics in Beijing. Nazaryan competed in the Olympics for a third time at the 2012 Summer Olympics. He announced before the Olympics began that it would be his last time competing.

Achievements

References

External links

 
 

1982 births
Living people
People from Hrazdan
Armenian male judoka
Olympic judoka of Armenia
Judoka at the 2004 Summer Olympics
Judoka at the 2008 Summer Olympics
Judoka at the 2012 Summer Olympics
Universiade medalists in judo
Universiade bronze medalists for Armenia
Medalists at the 2007 Summer Universiade